Leptosira is a genus of green algae, in the class Trebouxiophyceae.

References

External links

Trebouxiophyceae genera
Trebouxiophyceae